Harper Finn is a New Zealand singer and musician. He has written and produced ten singles and has announced an EP to be released in 2022. Following the release of his single ’Dance Away These Days’ Harper Finn was awarded ‘Breakthrough Artist of the Year' at The Aotearoa Music Awards in 2021.

Early life 
Harper Finn was born in Sydney, Australia, to New Zealand musician Tim Finn (of Split Enz and Crowded House) and television presenter Marie Azcona. 

The family moved back to Auckland, New Zealand when he was age 1. As a teenager he worked at an Auckland music venue. He featured in many of Tim Finn's music videos and sang backing vocals on a song from the album The View Is Worth the Climb. He spent some of his teenage years performing alongside his father in several of his events in New Zealand and Australia.

Career 
In 2018 Harper Finn released his first single "Look Who's Sorry Now".

Finn released 'Dance Away These Days' October 2nd 2020, the song was co-produced by five-time Grammy winner Cole MGN (Beck, Snoop Dogg, Blood Orange) and Tobias Kuhn (Dean Lewis, Milky Chance). The 'Dance Away These Days' official music video was co-directed by James K Lowe and Nicole Miller-Wong. Following this release Finn was nominated and then awarded '‘Breakthrough Artist of the Year' at The Aotearoa Music Awards in 2021 and has been described as having "unique sound, signature moves and the ability to hypnotise a crowd" 

Different Skies is the latest track from NEWCOMER, Harper’s 8-track EP that is set to be released later this year. NEWCOMER tells the stories of the places Harper’s stayed over the last couple of years and particularly his move to New York City.

Discography
This discography relates to releases by Harper Finn only (excluding remixes and covers).

Extended plays

Singles

Awards

Aotearoa Music Awards
The Aotearoa Music Awards honour outstanding artistic and technical achievements in the recording field.

|-
| 2021
| Harper Finn - "Dance Away These Days"
| potify Te Kaituhura Puoro Toa o te Tau | Breakthrough Artist of the Year Award
| 
|-

References

Living people
Harper
21st-century New Zealand male singers
New Zealand male singer-songwriters
Musicians from Auckland
1998 births

External links

Official Website